The 2016–17 season was the season of competitive football (soccer) in Cape Verde.

Diary of the season
early-October:
Janito Carvalho becomes coach for Académica da Praia
Cley becomes manager for ADESBA until February
Nelito (Antunes) again becomes coach for Boavista Praia for only two months, again in a season
October 8: Mindelense won their super cup for São Vicente
October 15: Mindelense won their first ever Champion's Cup for São Vicente
October 29:
Académica do Porto Novo won their super cup title for Santo Antão South
Onze Estrelas won their super cup for Boa Vista, the first that the goals were awarded as Sal Rei fielded an ineligible player
CD Sinagoga won their only super cup title for Santo Antão North
the 2016–17 São Vicente Association Cup begins
October 30: Boavista FC won their second friendly Boavista Champion's Cup title
November: Cadoram became coach of CD Sinagoga of the Santo Antão North Zone
November 4: the 2016-17 Santiago South First Division begins
November 5: Varandinha of Tarrafal won the local GAFT Cup for 2016
November 6:
Académica da Praia defeated ADESBA 3-0 and took the number one spot for Santiago South for only a week
Académica do Porto Novo won their second super cup title for Santo Antão
November 12: the 2016-17 Santo Antão North Premier Division and South Zone Island Championships begins
November 13:
Académico 83 won their super cup title for Maio
Desportivo da Praia defeated Travadores 1-2 and took the number one spot for Santiago South for two rounds, they had 9 points total at the third round
November 19
Real Marítimo was the first club to win the Maio Champion's Cup
Vulcânicos won the first ever Fogo Champion's Cup
November 25: the 2016-17 Santiago South Cup begins
November 26:
the 2016-17 Fogo Island First Division begins
Académico do Aeroporto won their super cup title for Sal
November 27: Académica da Brava won their super cup title for Brava
December:
Nhela became coach for Batuque FC
Marley Monteiro becomes coach for Sport Sal Rei Club
Tó Monteiro becomes coach for Onze Estrelas
mid-December: the 2016-17 Santiago North Zone First Division begins
December 1: Académico do Aeroporto do Sal celebrated its 50th year of foundation
December 3: Tchadense defeated Travadores 2-3 and took the number one spot for the next three weeks
December 11: Batuque FC won their Opening Tournament title for São Vicente
December 17
the 2016-17 Santiago Island North Zone First Division begins
the 2016-17 São Vicente Island/Regional First Division begins
December 18: Sport Sal Rei Club own their Association Cup title for Boa Vista
December 22: Vulcânicos defeated Baxada 2-0 and made it the highest scoring math of any tier 2 regional competitions for nearly two months, at tier 1 competitions, for four months
December 30:
SC Santa Maria won their only Opening Tournament title for Sal
Renovations, enlargement and an additional artificial turf construction project at Estádio Municipal 25 de Julho begins
mid-January:
Humberto Bettencourt became coach for Boavista Praia again in two years
Ney Loko became coach for Sporting Clube da Brava
January 6: Sporting Praia defeated ADESBA 5-0 and after Tchadense's 0-2 loss to Desportivo da Praia, took the number one spot for the remainder of the season
January 7: SC Atlético won their super cup title for São Nicolau
January 13: the 2016-17 Boa Vista Island League begins
January 14
the 2016-17 Maio Island First Division begins
the 2016-17 Sal Island First Division begins
the 2016-17 São Nicolau Island League begins
January 15: Sporting Brava won their Opening Tournament title for Brava
January 21: the 2016-17 Brava Island League begins
Late-January:
Humberto Bettencourt becomes coach of Boavista Praia once more in  years
Pirico becomes coach for SC Atlético of Ribeira Brava
February:
Daniel Cardoso becomes coach of AD Bairro
Carlos Sena Teixeira becomes president of AD Bairro
Alberto Teixeira becomes coach of Paulense
February 7: Santiago North Zone season was suspended by its regional association for two weeks due to that the referees needed the salaries for the 17th and the 26th rounds last season and the rounds of this season.
February 11: In Fogo's Second Division, Nova Era defeated Brasilim 0-20 and made it the highest scoring match of any division on the island in several seasons
February 19:
Boavista Praia defeated Os Garridos 8-0 and made it the highest scoring match in the region in four seasons
Paulense of the Santo Antão North Zone became listed as champions and to claim their 7th title, the second club to qualify into the 2017 championships after Mindelense, qualified as national champion of the previous season
Rosariense Clube will return to the Santo Antão North Zone's second division after two seasons of participation
February 25:
Santiago North Zone football (soccer) competitions resumed as the referees were paid four days earlier  by its sponsorship of two telecommunications companies, one of them was Cabo Verde Telecom and the municipalities where the clubs are based, it did not rescheduled the starting date of the national championships
São Vicente Premier Division: Derby was awarded 3-0 as Académica Mindelo fielded ineligible players, the first of five that Académica Mindelo was awarded against.
March 19: Académica do Porto Novo of the Santo Antão South Zone became champions and claimed their 11th title and qualified into the National Championships
March 25: The Regional Championships of Santo Antão North and South (Premier and Second) Zones finished for the season, Paulense and Académica Porto Novo into the championships
March 26: Sporting Brava became listed champions for Brava and qualified into the National Championships
April 1: The Santo Antão Cup final was not played as Rosariense did not show up to play with Académica do Porto Novo
April 2: CS Mindelense became regional champions for São Vicente
April 7: Sporting Brava defeated Benfica Brava 0-14 and became the highest scoring match of any of the tier-2 (regional top-flight) competitions in the nation
April 8: The Santo Antão South Cup final took place
April 9: After the end of the 20th round, Sporting Praia got their 10th title for Southern Santiago (20+ overall) and qualified into the National Championship, their next in three years, also Sporting made a new point record for Santiago South numbering 52, exceeded their 49 they got in 2005, of any top-flight regional championship competitions, it is third behind Santiago North's Varandinha and Scorpion Vermelho.
April 15:
Onze Unidos got 24 points, with four points ahead of a second placed club, Onze Unidos claimed their twelfth title for Maio, one week before the end of the regionals and qualified into the National Championships, their next in six years
GDRC Delta won their first and only Santiago South cup for the 2015-16 season (see 2015–16 in Cape Verdean football)
São Vicente Premier Division: Mindelense was awarded 3-0 as Académica fielded a suspended player, the last of five that Académica was awarded against
April 17: Rosariense Clube Ribeira Grande won their next North Zone's cup in a decade
April 22: Académica do Porto Novo won another cup title for the Santo Antão South Zone
April 23: 
Final competitions of the Maio Premier Division
Sport Sal Rei Club won their 10th title and their second straight for Boa Vista and qualified into the National Championships
Académica do Fogo defeated Baxada 14-0 and also became the highest scoring match of any regional tier-1 competitions in the nation alongside Sporting Brava's
Vulcânicos won their 10th title and their second straight for Fogo with 45 points and 66 goals, five more goals than the runner up and qualified into National Championships
April 24: Officials found out that Académica Mindelo fielded a fake goalkeeper in five of its matches and its positions were dropped from first to fifth and kicked out of National qualification, it was replaced with FC Derby, earlier positions changed.
April 29: CD Onze Unidos won their third cup title for Maio
April 30:
Final competition of the Brava Island League and the Fogo, Sal Santiago South and São Vicente Premier Divisions
Académico do Aeroporto won their 14th championship title for Sal and qualified into the National Championships
CS Mindelense won their 49th regional title for São Vicente, as they were 2016 national champions, runner-up FC Derby also qualified into the 2017 National Championships
FC Ultramarina won their 12th championship title for São Nicolau and qualified into the National Championships
May 5: Académica do Fogo won their cup title for Fogo
May 6:
Académica do Sal won their fifth cup title for Sal
FC Derby won their fourth cup title for São Vicente
May 7:
AJAC da Calheta de São Miguel, won their only regional championship title for Santiago North and qualified into the National Championships
Final competition of the São Nicolau Regional Championships took place
Sporting Clube da Praia claimed their regional cup title for Santiago South
May 9: FC Ultramarina won their title for São Nicolau
May 11: The Santiago North Regional Football Association deducted 3 points for AJAC and made Benfica Santiago North champions, AJAC fielded a suspended player Marco Aurélio at the 16th round match with Juventus Assomada, originally 2-4, it was originally awarded 3-0, AJAC did not.  The Judicial Council removed AJAC as regional champions and punished that club and put Benfica de Santa Cruz for competition at the nationals, the declaration became official.  It was the next ina season after Scorpion Vermelho-Varandinha. The relegation of AJAC de Calheta has been eliminated and Juventus Assomada became officially relegated as they finished 11th and inside the relegation zone.
May 13:
The 2017 Cape Verdean Football Championships begins, it was divided into three groups again and the first with four clubs each.
Onze Unidos defeated Ultramarina 2-1 and became the highest result of the national season
May 17: In Praia, the Capeverdean Football Federation (FCF) officially declared AJAC regional champions on May 17 and qualifies into the national competition as the suspended player in a 16th round match was not fielded and did not  score a single goal that match.
May 18: Chairman of AJAC, Amarildo Semedo did not liked that decision alongside some other clubs, and justice in sports is preserved.
May 20: Sporting Praia defeated Sal Rei 3-0 and became the season's highest match and also the highest goal difference
May 28: Mindelense (Group B) and Sporting Praia (Group C) currently has the most points each numbering 9
June 3: Académica Porto Novo defeated Académico do Aeroporto Sal 1-3 and became the second match being the season's highest
June 11: Académico do Aeroporto defeated Paulense 1-3 and became the third match being the season's highest
June 18:
Académica Porto Novo defeated Paulense 3-0 and became the fourth match being the season's highest
End of group stage of the National Football Championships
June 24: Semifinals of the National Football Championships begins
June 27: the Ultramarina Tarrafal-Mindelense semifinal match was cancelled twice
July 1: Original date of the end of semifinals of the National Football Championships
July 3–4: the Ultramarina Tarrafal-Mindelense semifinal match was removed due to that Estádio Orlando Rodrigues had no spare keys for the players to enter
July 8: the Capeverdean Football Federation unofficially awarded Mindelense 0-3 in the first leg against Ultramarina de Tarrafal, Ultramarina started to appeal
July 15:
Finals of the National Championships originally to begin but was rescheduled again
Ultramarina appealed and the 3-0 that were unofficially awarded to Mindelense was revoked, the date of the first leg match was set
July 23: Ultramarina Tarrafal-Mindelense second leg match delayed
August 13: Mindelense had their squad ready but did not appear to play in the matches later rescheduled, the club was disqualified, Ultramarina Tarrafal advanced into the finals
August 20: Sporting Praia defeated Ultramarina 1-2 at Estádio Orlando Rodrigues in Tarrafal de São Nicolau
August 27: Sporting Praia again defeated Ultramarina, this time with the result 3-2 and at home and claimed their 10th and recent national championship title
Tarrafal's Estrela dos Amadores celebrated its 25th year of the club's foundation

Final standings

Cape Verdean Football Championships

This was the second season divided into three groups and the first with a knockout stage. FC Ultramarina (Group A), CS Mindelense (of Group B) and Sporting Praia (Group C) finished first and qualified into the playoffs. The best second placed club who finished first Académica do Porto Novo also qualified.
Another delay occurred in July and was the next such delay in nine years.  The stadium access to Estádio Orlando Rodrigues was locked as the stadium did not have extra keys for the first leg due to an unknown reason. A week later, Mindelense was unofficially awarded 3-0 and the club was still no entrant into the finals.  Ultramarina appealed to the problems with their entry into the stadium.  It caused the next delay of the national championship finals competition in nine years (but not overall).  The first leg was rescheduled, Mindelense did not show up due to unknown reasons and Mindelense-Ultramarina Tarrafal club strength was probably 50/50, it wasn't held into August and after August 13, Mindelense was indeed disqualified and its second leg result was annulled, but several kept it as stood.  As Mindelense lost 0-2 in the second leg and the first leg unheld.  Mindelense was out of the competition and overall was fourth behind Académica Porto Novo. The match between Sporting Praia and Académica Porto Novo went one and won with a total of two goals to one with a victory in the second leg, Sporting had to wait  months for their final appearance where they won all two legs and won their next national title in five years.

Group A

Group B

Group C

Best second placed club
The second placed club with the most points (sometimes goals and matches if equal) qualified into the knockout stage.

Final Stages

Island or regional competitions

Regional Championships

Regional Cups

Regional Super Cups
The 2016 champion winner played with a 2016 cup winner (when a club won both, a second place club competed).

Regional Opening Tournaments/Association Cups

Regional Champions Cup
Each of the three islands held their first ever Champion's Cup

Transfer deals

Summer-Fall transfer window
The September/October transfer window runs from the end of the previous season in September up to mid-October.
 Adyr from CS Mindelense to FC Ultramarina Tarrafal
 Calú from  FC Zimbru Chişinău to Académica Mindelo
 Nildo from Académica Praia to Sporting Praia
 M. Teixeira from Desportivo Praia to Sporting Praia
 Matthew Mbutidem Sunday from Boavista Praia to Sporting Clube da Praia

Winter transfer window
31 January:  Calú from Académica do Mindelo to  Gil Vicente F.C.

See also
2016 in Cape Verde
2017 in Cape Verde
Timeline of Cape Verdean football

Notes

References

 
Seasons in Cape Verdean football
2016 in association football
2017 in association football